Emily Stevenson (July 26, 1925 - December 30, 2012) was a former utility who played in the All-American Girls Professional Baseball League.

A native of Champaign, Illinois, Emily Stevenson helped the Milwaukee Chicks win the regular season pennant and the championship title during their 1944 season. In her only year in the league, she served as a backup catcher for incumbent Dorothy Maguire and also patrolled the outfield for the Chicks.

Stevenson forms part of Women in Baseball, a permanent display based at the Baseball Hall of Fame and Museum in Cooperstown, New York, which was unveiled in 1988 to honor the entire All-American Girls Professional Baseball League.

Career statistics
Batting

Fielding

Sources

All-American Girls Professional Baseball League players
Baseball players from Illinois
Sportspeople from Champaign, Illinois
1925 births
2012 deaths
21st-century American women